Different Strokes by Different Folks is a remix and cover album by American funk, and soul band Sly and the Family Stone.

Description
Released first as a Starbucks-exclusive in 2005, this version (recognizable by its black background cover) featured 12 tracks. The extended 14-track version of the album was released in 2006 by Epic Records It included two additional tracks: "Don't Call Me Nigger, Whitey" and "Thank You Nation 1814". Each track is a remix of a previously released Sly and the Family Stone song.

Track listing

References

2005 remix albums
Epic Records remix albums
Sly and the Family Stone albums
Albums produced by Sly Stone